Torna (Slovak: Turňa, Latin and Hungarian: Torna) is the name of a historic administrative county (comitatus) of the Kingdom of Hungary. It was located in present-day southeastern Slovakia and northern Hungary; today Turňa is only an informal designation of the corresponding territory in Slovakia.

The initially large county was one of the original counties in the Kingdom of Hungary, but was gradually reduced to a territory corresponding to a small territory around the Turňa River. The capital of the county was Turňa Castle, later the town of Turňa nad Bodvou.

From 1785 to 1790, 1848–1859, and ultimately in 1882 it was merged with the county Abov to form the county Abaúj-Torna (Abov-Turňa).

Counties in the Kingdom of Hungary